Courtney Braden Ford is an American actress. She is best known for her roles on television, such as playing Christine Hill on Dexter (2009), Portia Bellefleur on True Blood (2011), Lily on Parenthood (2012), Tonia Pyne on Murder in the First (2014), Kate Taylor on Revenge (2014), Kelly Kline on Supernatural (2016–2018) and Nora Darhk on Legends of Tomorrow (2017–2020). She also played the lead role in the Lifetime television film Kept Woman (2015).

Career 
Ford described her career as stagnant for the ten years preceding 2008, in which she considered ceasing work as an actress. However, during what she considered to be her last audition, Ford was cast to play reporter Christine Hill on Showtime's television series Dexter.

She has been cast on the hit HBO series True Blood as Portia Bellefleur, Andy Bellefleur's sister. She was a recurring cast member in the fourth season. In the game series Gears of War, she voices Maria Santiago, the lost wife of the character Dom. In Fallout 4 (2015), Ford voices Piper Wright, a potential companion and the Editor-in-Chief of Diamond City's newspaper, .

She also appeared in the ninth episode of season four of How I Met Your Mother titled "The Naked Man" and The Big Bang Theory season five episode "The Good Guy Fluctuation".

Ford first appeared as Nora Darhk, the daughter of Damien Darhk in the Legends of Tomorrow episode "Return of the Mack". She was promoted to series regular prior to the start of season 4. Her husband Brandon Routh was already a series regular since the show began. In August 2019, it was announced that Ford and Routh, whose characters had become romantically linked at this point, would depart Legends of Tomorrow during the fifth season. Their final episode as series regulars was "Romeo v Juliet: Dawn of Justness". They would return for the show's one hundredth episode, as well as separate episodes of The Flash's "Armageddon" event, Ford in part five.

Personal life
Ford was born in Huntington Beach, California. She and Brandon Routh were engaged on August 23, 2006, after three years of dating, and married November 24, 2007, at El Capitan Ranch in Santa Barbara. They have a son, Leo James.

Filmography

Film

Television

Video games

References

External links
 
 

20th-century American actresses
21st-century American actresses
American film actresses
American television actresses
American video game actresses
Living people
Actresses from Huntington Beach, California
Hispanic and Latino American actresses
Year of birth missing (living people)